The Norton 961/SS Commando is a motorcycle that was produced by Norton Motorcycles, the Oregon based company that bought the rights to the Norton brand name. Owner Kenny Dreer progressed from restoring and upgrading Norton Commandos to producing whole machines. He modernised the design and in the early 2000s went into production of the VR880. This machine was built on the basis of the original Commando, with upgraded components and a significantly modified engine. 

Dreer produced 50 of these machines before deciding to build an all-new motorcycle. With funding from Oliver Curme, Dreer hired a small design and development team led by Paul Gaudio (Design and development director), Simon-Pierre Smith (Lead Engineer), and Patrick Leyshock (Testing, Sourcing.) 

The 961 Commando never reached production in America due to lack of funding, and the company closed its doors in April 2006. The Commando 961 SS combined traditional Norton cafe racer styling with new technology. This included carbon fibre wheels to reduce weight, a counterbalanced engine, and a chro-moly tubular steel frame.

Future

After fifteen years of US ownership UK businessman Stuart Garner, owner of Norton Racing Ltd, acquired the rights to the Norton Commando brand. His company, Norton Motorcycles (UK) Ltd, established a new factory at Donington Park, Leicestershire in 2008 to manufacture a new Commando model, designed by Simon Skinner. There are three models in the new Commando range: a limited edition of 200 Commando 961 SEs, a Cafe Racer and a Sport model. 

In March 2010 Norton shipped the first new Norton Commando for over 30 years; and by mid-April 2010 the company was shipping 5-10 new machines per week. The engine is a 961 cc fuel-injected air-cooled ohv 270° parallel-twin that produces . The short-stroke engine is oversquare, with an 88 x 79 mm bore and stroke. At the bike's front are inverted (USD) forks and twin disc brakes. The engine (rather like the BSA A7) is "semi-unit", in that the 5-speed gearbox is a separate casting, but is bolted directly to the primary chaincase. Some styling is reminiscent of the original Norton Commando, especially the engine and petrol tank. The new Norton has received favourable press reviews. 

In a March 2012 interview, Garner revealed that Norton was receiving support from the UK Government's Export Credit Guarantee service, which should alleviate cash-flow problems and enable a significant increase in factory output. Garner added that Norton now makes an increasing number of components "in-house", reducing reliance on outside suppliers.

See also
 Norton Motorcycle Company
 List of Norton motorcycles

References

External links

Norton Motorcycles web site

961 Commando
Motorcycles introduced in 2006
Standard motorcycles